Dias is a common surname in the Portuguese language, and therefore in Portugal and Brazil. It is cognate to the Spanish language surname Díaz.

Notable people with the surname include:

Albertina Dias, Portuguese long-distance runner
Aline Dias, Brazilian actress
Alycia Dias (born 1992), Pakistani playback singer
Ana Dias (photographer) (born 1984), Portuguese photographer
André Dias, Brazilian football player
Annesley Dias (1927-2009), Sri Lankan Sinhalese comedian
Avani Dias (born 1991/1992), Sri Lankan-Australian journalist
Bartolomeu Dias (1450–1500), Portuguese explorer
Bennet Dias Gunasekera (1919–2002), Sri Lankan Sinhala businessman and politician
Cello Dias, Brazilian guitarist for Against All Will
Daniel Dias Gunasekera, Sri Lankan Sinhala businessman and politician
Denny Dias, American guitarist
Dilrukshi Dias Wickramasinghe, 46th Solicitor General of Sri Lanka
Dinis Dias, Portuguese explorer
Diogo Dias, Portuguese explorer
Fernando da Piedade Dias dos Santos, Angolan politician
Fernando Dias van Dúnem, Angolan politician
Filipe Oliveira Dias, Portuguese architect
Gaspar Dias (ca. 1560–1590), Portuguese Mannerist painter
Gonçalves Dias, Brazilian poet
Jagath Dias, Sri Lankan Sinhalese Army general, former Deputy Ambassador of Sri Lanka to Germany, Switzerland, and the Vatican
Jacqueline Maria Dias, Pakistani nursing professor
Kaitlyn Dias (born 1999), Child actress, voice of Riley Andersen from Inside Out
Lucky Dias (born 1951), Sri Lankan Sinhalese actor and producer
Luisa Dias Diogo, Prime Minister of Mozambique
Maria Berenice Dias, Brazilian judge
Michael Dias, Sri Lankan barrister, academic and jurist who practised in the UK
Nicholas Dias Abeysingha (1719–1794), Sri Lankan Maha Mudaliyar
Paulo Dias de Novais, Portuguese colonizer of Africa
Pêro Dias, Portuguese explorer
Ranga Dias (cricketer), Sri Lankan cricketer
Ron Dias (1937–2013), American animator and painter
Ron Dias (director) (born 1983), Canadian filmmaker, best known for Bite of a Mango
Roy Dias (born 1952), Sri Lankan Chetty cricketer
Rui Jorge de Sousa Dias Oliveira, Portuguese football player
Sachin Premashan Dias Angodavidanalage (born 2000), Sri Lankan Sinhala badminton player
Solomon Dias Bandaranaike, Ceylonese government administrator
Solomon West Ridgeway Dias Bandaranaike, Sri Lankan politician
Sirimavo Ratwatte Dias Bandaranaike, Sri Lankan politician
Virna Dias, Brazilian volleyball player 
Ruben Dias, Manchester City football player
Dias Gomes, Brazilian writer
Steven Dias, Indian footballer
Sumangala Dias, Sri Lankan Sinhalese air force officer
Wakunugoda Gayathri Irosha Dias, Sri Lankan Sinhala cinema and TV actress

Portuguese-language surnames
Surnames from given names